William John (6 October 1878 – 27 August 1955) was a Welsh Labour Party politician, and a Member of Parliament (MP) for thirty years.

At the 1920 Rhondda West by-election, he was elected as MP for the safe Labour constituency of Rhondda West, and held the seat until he retired from the House of Commons at the 1950 general election.

He was Labour's Deputy Chief Whip from 1942 to 1945, serving in Winston Churchill's war-time coalition government as Comptroller of the Household from 1942 to 1944 and as a Lord of the Treasury from 1944 to 1945.

References

External links 
 

1878 births
1955 deaths
Miners' Federation of Great Britain-sponsored MPs
Ministers in the Churchill wartime government, 1940–1945
UK MPs 1918–1922
UK MPs 1922–1923
UK MPs 1923–1924
UK MPs 1924–1929
UK MPs 1929–1931
UK MPs 1931–1935
UK MPs 1935–1945
UK MPs 1945–1950
Welsh Labour Party MPs